The Norrland Artillery Regiment, designation A 4, was a Swedish Army artillery regiment that traced its origins back to the 19th century. The regiment's soldiers were originally recruited from the provinces of Norrland. The regiment was disbanded in 1997. From 1998 to 2000, the Boden Artillery Regiment was known by this name.

History 
The regiment was created in 1893 by splitting off two batteries from 1st Svea Artillery Regiment and two batteries from 1st Göta Artillery Regiment which formed six batteries of Norrland Artillery Regiment. The regiment was garrisoned in Östersund but a detachment in Boden was created in 1910, this detachment was split off in 1928 and created Norrbotten Artillery Corps. The regiment's designation was A 4 (4th Artillery Regiment). Norrland Artillery Regiment was disbanded in 1997.

Campaigns 
None

Organisation 
Unknown

Heraldry and traditions

Colours, standards and guidons
The regimental standard was presented by His Majesty the King Gustaf V on his birthday on 16 June 1938.

Coat of arms
The coat of the arms of the Norrland Artillery Regiment (A 1) 1977–1997. Blazon: "Azure, the provincial badge of Jämtland, an elk passant argent, attacked on the back by a rising falcon and in the front by a rampant dog both or; all animals armed and langued gules. The shield surmounted two gunbarrels of older pattern in saltire or. The gunbarrels may be sable".

Medals
In 1997, the Norrlands artilleriregementes (A 4) minnesmedalj ("Norrland Artillery Regiment (A 4) Commemorative Medal") in silver (NorrlartregSMM) of the 8th size was established. The medal ribbon is orange moiré with two red lines on each side.

Heritage
Upon the disbandment of the regiment, the regimental traditions, standards and names was taken over by Boden Artillery Regiment. On 30 June 2000, the Boden Artillery Regiment, or Norrland Artillery Regiment which it was called then, was disbanded. From 1 July 2000, the standard and its traditions was passed on to the Artillery Regiment.

Commanding officers
Regimental commander from 1893 to 1997.

1893–1898: Colonel Ernst Boheman
1898–1907: Colonel Herman Birger Holmberg
1907–1913: Colonel Olof Erland Hofstedt
1913–1916: Colonel Arvid Edmund Rudling
1916–1922: Colonel Hugo Nordenfelt
1922–1927: Colonel Johan Georg Sylvan
1927–1934: Colonel Georg Ohlson
1934–1939: Colonel Per Falk
1939–1942: Colonel Carl-Gustaf Hamilton
1942–1943: Colonel Carl Årmann
1943–1947: Colonel Fernando Odenrick
1947–1952: Colonel Thorsten Berggren
1952–1959: Colonel Stig Lindström
1959–1965: Colonel Göran Schildt
1965–1975: Colonel Lennart Brant-Lundin
1975–1979: Colonel Sven Ragnar Eugén Holmberg
1979–1982: Colonel Thure Östberg
1982–1985: Colonel Lars-Olof Strandberg
1985–1987: Colonel Dan Albin Snell
1987–1992: Colonel Sten Sture Gustaf Ankarcrona
1992–1994: Colonel Lennart Uller
1994–1996: Colonel Lars Lagrell
1996–1997: Colonel Torsten Gerhardsson
1997–1997: Lieutenant Colonel Sten Bredberg

Names, designations and locations

See also
List of Swedish artillery regiments

Footnotes

References

Notes

Print

Further reading

Östersund Garrison
Artillery regiments of the Swedish Army
Military units and formations established in 1893
Military units and formations disestablished in 1997
1893 establishments in Sweden
1997 disestablishments in Sweden
Disbanded units and formations of Sweden